The La Nouvelle branch is a  branch of the Canal du Midi in Aude, southern France which runs from the Canal du Midi through Narbonne and on to the Mediterranean. The La Nouvelle branch is designated a UNESCO World Heritage Site as part of the Canal du Midi and is managed by the French navigation authority, Voies navigables de France.

Canal de Jonction

The Canal de Jonction runs in a dead straight line and was built in 1776 to provide access to Narbonne from the Canal du Midi via the Canal de la Robine. The Canal de Jonction enters the Aude some 800 m upstream from where the Canal de la Robine leaves it. Prior to 1776 the Canal du Midi port for Narbonne was Le Somail,  by road from the city centre.

Locks on the Canal de Jonction

The Aude

Navigation is in the river Aude for a distance of only  between the two canals. However, on leaving the Canal de Jonction it is necessary first to head upstream before turning and coming back downstream against the opposite bank to the Canal de la Robine in order to avoid shallows caused by silt banks in the middle of the channel.

Canal de la Robine

Following its opening in 1681, the commercial success of the Canal du Midi was such that Narbonne traders demanded improved access to it, so in 1686 the Canal de la Robine was constructed by Vauban as a lockless open cut following an abandoned course of the Aude. A century later, when the Canal de Jonction was constructed, the Canal de la Robine was straightened and six single locks were built to deal with the more severe gradients, Narbonne finally had direct waterway access to the Canal du Midi.

From the Aude the canal passes through the centre of Narbonne and under the Merchants' Bridge (fr: le pont des Marchands) which is one of the few bridges in France which is still lined with houses. From there it runs through Bages and the Ile Sainte Lucie nature reserve before meeting the Mediterranean at Port-la-Nouvelle.

Locks on the Canal de la Robine

A. Depending on the River Aude water level.

Notes

See also
Locks on the Canal du Midi

References

External links
 Canal du Midi and La Nouvelle branch, with maps and details of places, ports and moorings, by the author of Inland Waterways of France, 8th ed., 2010, Imray
 Navigation details for 80 French rivers and canals (French waterways website section)

Canal du Midi
World Heritage Sites in France
Canals in France
Transport in Occitania (administrative region)
Buildings and structures in Aude
Canals opened in 1776